Plesiomesosites is an extinct genus of longhorn beetles of the subfamily Lamiinae, containing the following species:

 Plesiomesosites dissitus (Zhang, Sung & Zhang, 1994) †
 Plesiomesosites exaratus (Zhang, Sung & Zhang, 1994) †
 Plesiomesosites trigonius (Zhang, Sung & Zhang, 1994) †

References

Mesosini